David Christopher Lane (born April 29, 1956 in Burbank, California) is a professor of philosophy and sociology at Mt. San Antonio College, in Walnut, California. He is notable for his book The Making of a Spiritual Movement: The Untold Story of Paul Twitchell and Eckankar which exposed the origins of Eckankar and demonstrated the plagiarism of its founder, Paul Twitchell. He is also notable for introducing to a wider audience the teachings of Baba Faqir Chand, the Indian exponent of Surat Shabd Yoga from Hoshiapur in the book, The Unknowing Sage: The Life and Work of Baba Faqir Chand. Lane founded the journal, Understanding Cults and Spiritual Movements in the 1980s which featured critical studies of John-Roger Hinkins and Movement of Spiritual Inner Awareness, Adi Da, and Sathya Sai Baba.

Education
Lane has a PhD and an MA in the sociology of knowledge from the University of California at San Diego, where he was also a recipient of a Regents Fellowship. Additionally, he has an MA in History and Phenomenology of Religion from the Graduate Theological Union in Berkeley, California and a BA from California State University, Northridge. Lane received his A.A. from Los Angeles Valley College and attended Notre Dame High School in his youth.

Career
Lane was a lecturer in religious studies at California State University from 2001 to 2013 who specialized in the study of new religious movements including cults and the interface between science and religion.

Raised Catholic, Lane went on to be initiated in 1978 by Charan Singh (guru) of Radha Soami Satsang Beas. He later has become critical of some but not all of the teachings of Radha Soami Sant Mat. Lane has been a strict vegetarian since the age of 16 and in a recent interview on Skeptiko  mentions that he meditates from 2 to 3 hours daily.

He previously taught at the University of California, San Diego, The California School of Professional Psychology, the University of Humanistic Studies, Palomar College, Mira Costa College, and the University of London and other academic institutions. He has given invited lectures at the London School of Economics, California State University, Fullerton. In 2010 was a keynote speaker at the SPIRCON conference at the Dayalbagh Educational Institute in Agra, India, featured in the book Spiritual Consciousness. In November 2014 Lane gave a plenary talk at QANSAS (Quantum and Nano Computing Systems and Applications) International Conference in Agra. The talk was entitled "The Oceanic Metaphor : Meaning Equivalence (M.E.), Probability Theory, and The Virtual Simulation Hypothesis of Consciousness." This talk was published as the book, The Oceanic Metaphor. On October 12, 2015, Lane was the keynote speaker at California State University, Fullerton, sponsored by the Sociology Department, on the topic of the illusory nature behind religious visions and the Chandian Effect which was published as a book. Lane, along with Mark Juergensmeyer was the plenary speaker on August 24, 2018, at the Dayalbagh Educational Institute for the 200th birth anniversary of Shiv Dayal Singh, the founder of Radhasoami.

In an interview in the San Diego Reader published on June 22, 1995, Lane complained about receiving death threats from defenders of several new religious movements or cults. He has also been involved in a number of lawsuits due to his critical stance of these groups.

Bibliography

See also
 List of cult researchers
 Cults
 Mark Juergensmeyer

References

External links

 Online diary of Lane, other writings, Runnebohm digital collection
The Neural Surfer website 
Lane writings for integralworld.net

Movement of Spiritual Inner Awareness
Academics of the University of London
Living people
1956 births
Researchers of new religious movements and cults
Shabda
Critics of new religious movements